Beauty and the Beard is an album by Al Hirt released by RCA Victor in 1964. Ann-Margret was featured on the album. The album was arranged by Marty Paich and produced by Steve Sholes.

The album landed on the Billboard 200 chart in 1964, reaching #84.

Personnel
Ann-Margret - vocals
Al Hirt - trumpet, vocals
Al Hendrickson - guitar
Fred Crane - piano
Lowell Miller - bass
Jimmy Zitano - drums
Red Norvo - vibraphone
Eddie Miller - tenor saxophone
Gerry Hirt - trombone
Pee Wee Spitelera - clarinet
Marty Paich - arrangements, conductor

Chart positions
Album

References

1964 albums
Al Hirt albums
Albums produced by Steve Sholes
Albums arranged by Marty Paich
RCA Records albums